Carminia Lourdes Cynthia Arnaldo Gutierrez (born November 22, 1969), better known as Chin-Chin Gutierrez, is a Filipina actress and environmentalist.

Gutierrez starred in a number of films during the 1990s, among them are Maalaala Mo Kaya: The Movie (1994) with Aiko Melendez and Richard Gomez, Sa Aking Mga Kamay (1998) with Christopher de Leon and Aga Muhlach and April, May and June with Agot Isidro and Alma Concepcion in 1998 for Star Cinema.

Personal life
Gutierrez is the daughter of botanist Dr. Hermes Gutierrez and painter Cecilia Arnaldo.

She earned her bachelor's degree in communication arts from Miriam College and was enrolled in a combined MA/PhD program in organizational development (major in transformative spirituality) at the Southeast Asia Interdisciplinary Development Institute (SAIDI), recently completing the same.

Gutierrez endorsed Pantene Shampoo in 1995. She retired from acting in 2010.

Advocacy
Gutierrez is the founding chair and president of the ecological foundation Alaga LAHAT, which she created in 2006. This organization was a member of the Eco-Waste Coalition. Previous to having her own group, she was also a founding member and officer of Mother Earth Foundation. 

A vegetarian, she starred in an ad for PETA Asia-Pacific in which she said that "fish are friends, not food".

Filmography

Television

Film

Music
In late 2003, Gutierrez released, after two years in the making, an album of her versions of lullabies from around the Philippine archipelago, in around half a dozen languages and dialects, including Hiligaynon, Waray, Cebuano, Bicol, Tagalog and others. The album, UYAYI: A Collection of Philippine Lullabies, was the result of field research capturing sound recordings of elders around the country singing their traditional songs for the youth, then a process of laborious re-recording of the songs, accompanied by Pinoy musicians such as Bo Razon, Joey Ayala, Tots Tolentino, Malou Matute and Rachel Conanan. The double CD includes one CD of her music, and one of the field recordings, plus a short video of the making.  It has won several awards, received a National Commission for Culture and the Arts grant, and was the focus of a few music showcases.

Awards and recognition
2004
 Recipient of the TOWNS (The Outstanding Women in the Nation's Service) Award for her environmental advocacy.

References

1969 births
Living people
Filipino film actresses
Filipino television actresses
Filipino environmentalists
Filipino women comedians
Actresses from Manila
20th-century Filipino actresses
21st-century Filipino actresses
Miriam College alumni
Carmelite nuns
21st-century Filipino Roman Catholic nuns